Jan Wong (born August 15, 1952) is a Canadian academic, journalist, and writer. Wong worked for The Globe and Mail, serving as Beijing correspondent from 1988 to 1994, when she returned to write from Canada. She is the daughter of Montreal businessman Bill Wong, founder of Bill Wong's buffet in 1963, and earlier of the House of Wong which was the city's first Chinese restaurant to open outside Chinatown.

Life after the Cultural Revolution
Towards the end of the Cultural Revolution period, she left McGill University and flew to China. The Maoist became one of two foreign college students permitted to study at Beijing University. While at Beijing she denounced Yin Luoyi, a trusting fellow student who had sought her help to escape communist China to the West. The student was subsequently shamed and expelled.  "She suffered a lot ... she was sent to the countryside for hard labour. When she came back, she fought hard to clear her name." Long after, having returned for a second visit after her own return to the West, and having eventually found Yin Luoyi again, Wong took comfort in learning she had not been her confidante's only betrayer, and that she did not express anger.  Wong wrote another book, and did interviews on her own experience.

Wong met her future husband Norman Shulman while studying in China and  married him in 1976. The couple have two sons: Ben (b. 1991) and Sam (b. 1993). Shulman, an  American draft dodger of the Vietnam Era, had joined his father Jack Shulman in China and remained there when Jack and his wife Ruth left China during the turmoil of the Cultural Revolution. Shulman worked as a text-polisher for Chinese propaganda magazine China Reconstructs.

Journalism career
In the late 1970s, Wong began her career in journalism when she was hired as a news assistant by Fox Butterfield, China correspondent for the New York Times.  Wong became tired of Party ideology and returned to Canada from Beijing.  She then studied journalism at Columbia, receiving a master's degree, and found work with the Montreal Gazette, Boston Globe and the Wall Street Journal before joining the Globe and Mail as a business reporter.

In 1988, the paper sent her to China where she worked for six years as its foreign correspondent, among other things covering the Tiananmen Massacre.  She later chronicled her Chinese experience in a book, Red China Blues, which was promptly banned in China. After a return trip in the late nineties, she produced a second book entitled Jan Wong's China, a somewhat less personal account of social life, the economy, and politics in modern-day China.

After China
From 1996 to 2002, Wong was best known for her Lunch with... column in The Globe and Mail, in which she had lunch with a celebrity, who was usually but not always Canadian. Her Lunch columns were often noted for publishing her theatrical take on the private, titillating side of her lunch companions — Margaret Atwood was depicted as a prickly diva who refused to eat her lunch because she was unhappy with the table, and Gene Simmons revealed the size of his penis.  In one of her most famous Lunch columns, Wong took a homeless woman to lunch.

After Lunch with Jan Wong was retired in 2002, Wong moved on to other journalistic roles with The Globe and Mail. In 2006, Wong attracted attention by imitating the work of Barbara Ehrenreich and going undercover as a cleaning lady in wealthy Toronto homes. While employed by the Globe and Mail as a reporter, Jan Wong impersonated a maid, and then wrote about her experiences in a five-part series on low-income living. The newspaper published the stories in the spring of 2006. Members of a Markham family sued the newspaper and Wong, alleging they suffered "significant embarrassment and mental distress."

Dawson College controversy

Wong published the article "Get under the desk" in The Globe and Mail on September 16, 2006. In it, she drew a link between the actions of Marc Lépine, Valery Fabrikant, and Kimveer Gill, perpetrators of the shootings of the École Polytechnique, Concordia University, and Dawson College, respectively; and the existence in Quebec of bill 101, the "decades-long linguistic struggle". She implied a relation between the fact that the three were not old-stock Québécois and the murders they committed, since they were, according to Wong, alienated in a Quebec society concerned with "racial purity".

Public outcry and political condemnation, and publicity soon followed. The Saint-Jean-Baptiste Society lodged a complaint to the Press Council of Quebec and Quebec Premier Jean Charest called the article a "disgrace" and, in an open letter to the Globe, wrote that it was a testimony to her ignorance of Canadian values which demonstrated a profound incomprehension of  Quebec society. Charest demanded an apology from Wong to all Québécois. Prime Minister Stephen Harper denounced Wong's article in a letter to the newspaper published on September 21, 2006 saying that her "argument is patently absurd and without foundation." On September 20, the House of Commons unanimously passed a motion requesting an apology for the column.

Globe and Mail editor Edward Greenspon responded to the controversy by publishing a column asserting that Wong's opinion should not have been included in the piece. Wong viewed this as a betrayal by her employer, as Greenspon had previously read and approved her story.

Wong descended into a long period of deep depression following the controversy and, unable to work, went on sick leave. The Globe ordered her back to work, withdrew her sick pay and ultimately negotiated her dismissal with an undisclosed monetary settlement. According to Wong: "I wrote a feature story that sparked a political backlash, my employers failed to support me and later silenced me, and after I became clinically depressed, they fired me."

Recent work
As of 2009, Wong was an occasional Friday host on The Current on CBC Radio 1.

In 2010, Wong was Visiting Irving Chair of Journalism at St. Thomas University in Fredericton, New Brunswick, and is currently an associate professor there.

Her fifth book, Out of the Blue: A Memoir of Workplace Depression, Recovery, Redemption and, Yes, Happiness, is a memoir of her experience with clinical depression in which Jan Wong describes in detail the backlash she received immediately after her article appeared; and how the Globe and Mail management, in her view, abandoned her in the face of a torrent of negative reaction from all sides.  She found the 'exact moment I began my descent into depression' when she was shattered by racial attack.  This book was self-published after Doubleday, the publisher of her previous books, pulled out mere days before print although Doubleday denied any legal interference from The Globe;  it was released May 5, 2012, and became an instant bestseller.

The Globe alleged that passages in the book violated a confidentiality agreement that was part of the settlement of Wong's grievance with the newspaper. An arbitrator's ruling in July 2013 ordered Wong to return her severance payment to the Globe and Mail. Wong challenged the arbitrator's decision in an Ontario court in 2014. In November 2014, the Ontario Superior Court upheld the arbitration award requiring Wong to repay the Globe and Mail her $209,000 termination settlement and also ordered her to pay $15,000 in legal fees to both the Globe and Mail and the union.

Her latest book is Apron Strings: Navigating Food And Family In France, Italy, And China. Published in September, 2017, it was named a must-read book by both the CBC and the Toronto Star. As Chris Nuttall-Smith (top chef Canada) wrote: "a sharp-minded — and famously sharp-tongued — reporter drags her fully grown, chef-trained son on a homestay cooking tour of France, Italy, and China. What could possibly not go wrong? Inquisitive, caustic, delicious, and can’t-look-away entertaining, this is Jan Wong at the peak of her powers."

Published books

 (Contains besides extensive autobiographical material an eyewitness account of the Tiananmen Massacre and the basis for a realistic estimate of the number of victims.)
 
 
 
 US edition: 
 UK edition:

Notes and sources

External links

1952 births
Living people
Anglophone Quebec people
Canadian journalists of Chinese descent
Canadian women journalists
Canadian women non-fiction writers
Canadian writers of Asian descent
Columbia University Graduate School of Journalism alumni
McGill University alumni
The Globe and Mail columnists
Academic staff of St. Thomas University (New Brunswick)
Canadian women columnists
Writers from Montreal